Sammy Lee (born 14 January 1999) is a British amateur boxer who is affiliated with Premier ABC. He won light heavyweight gold in the 2018 Commonwealth Games.

Lee was selected to compete at the 2019 World Championships in Yekaterinburg, Russia, where he lost by split decision (4:1) to Georgy Kushitashvili in the second round.

References

1999 births
Living people
British male boxers
Commonwealth Games medallists in boxing
Commonwealth Games gold medallists for Wales
Boxers at the 2018 Commonwealth Games
Light-heavyweight boxers
Medallists at the 2018 Commonwealth Games